Chake-Chake is a town located on the Tanzanian island of Pemba and capital of Chake Chake District. It is in the centre of a deep indentation in the west coast called Chake-Chake Bay.
Chake-Chake is historically the capital of Pemba Island, and the seat of Pemba's court. Pemba's only airport is 7 km south-east of Chake-Chake. The Mkama Ndume ruins are close to the airport in Pujini village.

Climate
Chake Chake has a tropical climate, yet milder than Tanzania's mainland or Unguja island.

See also
Historic Swahili Settlements

References

Swahili people
Swahili city-states
Swahili culture
Cities in Zanzibar
Pemba Island